is a Nintendo DS role-playing video game and an enhanced remake of the 1991 SNES game, Final Fantasy IV, also known as Final Fantasy II in North America for the SNES. It was released as part of the Final Fantasy series 20th anniversary celebrations on December 20, 2007 in Japan, on July 22, 2008 in North America, and on September 5 in Europe.

The game was developed by Matrix Software, the same team responsible for the 3D Final Fantasy III remake, and was supervised by members of the original development team: Takashi Tokita served as executive producer and director, Tomoya Asano as producer, and Hiroyuki Ito as battle designer. Animator Yoshinori Kanada wrote the new cutscenes.

The game was well received by critics and fans alike; it was praised for being sufficiently faithful to the original while expanding on many gameplay and story elements.

The game was released for iOS on the App Store in 2012, for Android in 2013 and for Windows in 2014.

Gameplay

Final Fantasy IV retains the original Active Time Battle System from the initial Super Nintendo release. Similar to the previous remake of Final Fantasy III on the Nintendo DS, the control of stylus is limited and optional in order to retain the same control input while allowing other players to use the Nintendo DS's unique touch control scheme. The system allows for certain character-only abilities to be transferred to other characters who did not have them in the original and previous re-releases of Final Fantasy IV. Up to three abilities can be transferred to temporary party members. When leaving the party, temporary characters will yield abilities of their own, the number of which is dependent on how many abilities they were given. There are also other abilities; some scattered around the world, and some that become available after certain story events. This new system entails another new feature: command menu customization. All commands in a character's battle menu, except the "Items" command, can be replaced with augments. This includes individual abilities that are ordinarily contained in a group (e.g. "Curaga" can be added directly to Rosa's command list, rather than only being accessible through the White Magic sub-list). The Augment System was devised to replace the system in Final Fantasy IV Advance where the characters that were temporary in the original version became playable again at a certain point, as the developers felt that this system changed the game too much.

Other exclusive enhancements to the DS version of the game include Minigames. Unlike the main game, minigames are stylus-control only. Their function is to increase the power of Rydia's personal Eidolon, who takes her place in the battle line-up, and acts under computer control according to abilities assigned to him by the player. The minigames can be played in either single-player or wireless (not online) multiplayer modes. The game also features a New Game Plus. This allows players to start a new game with certain enhancements, such as rare or secret items and equipment, carried over from a previously completed game. Certain other new features are only available in a New Game Plus, such as hidden bosses on the face of the moon and the summit of Mt. Ordeals. Because of the voice-acted scenes, Namingway cannot change any character's name as he did in the original game. After realizing this, he travels the world, changing his own name to fit each occupation he takes up. Examples of his name changes include "Mappingway" (charting the maps on the lower screen), "Campingway", and "Weddingway". Following Namingway around the world and engaging in his sidequest yields numerous rewards. With the removal of the limit on items that the player can carry, Fat Chocobo no longer stores items, and instead can be called on in order to access the new bestiary and the video and music player, as well as the Whyt minigames.

Plot

The original storyline of Final Fantasy IV is retained, and some of the previously missing script has been worked into the DS version in the form of flashbacks, including Golbez becoming Zemus's pawn and the childhoods of Cecil, Kain, and Rosa.

Development

The official developer blog (maintained by producer Tomoya Asano) has outlined several key features of the remake. As in the original, players can reform their party with whomever they choose as party leader. When the player enters the menu, the party leader will now appear on the bottom screen where the player can read their thoughts about what is happening in the story at that time (the development team suggests players check this feature often for humorous anecdotes).

Other developer blog entries have focused on the art and programming of the game. According to the art director, Matrix tried to make each location of the game feel unique. For example, the desert kingdom of Damcyan has taken on a Middle-Eastern flair, Fabul has been given a Chinese feeling, and Eblan has been given the feeling of a Ninja residence, which was not possible in the Super Famicom edition due to limited data capacity. The game displays more characters and enemies on screen during battle compared to Final Fantasy III, which required the modeling team to reduce the number of polygons per character. The main programmer also suggests that the game is much larger than Final Fantasy III from a data standpoint, and compressing all the data to fit on a 1Gb ROM was difficult, largely due to the voice data.

According to director Takashi Tokita, the scenario writer and lead game designer of the original release, three quarters of the original script had been left out of the original Super Famicom version. In a Q&A feature on the official Square Enix Members page, Tokita corrected this by saying that the original story script was never cut, but during the development of the original release, the game's text could not fit and had to be revised to a quarter of its intended size.

Music

Square Enix held a casting for a vocalist to sing a rendition of Final Fantasy IVs "Theme of Love" composed by Nobuo Uematsu. Megumi Ida was selected from approximately 800 applicants to perform the song . The song was arranged by Kenichiro Fukui, with the lyrics penned by scenario writer Takashi Tokita. It only appears in the Japanese release of the game, over the ending credits - international versions cut the song in its entirety and replace it with a music track from the game itself.

Reception

As of July 9, 2008, the game has sold 612,044 copies in Japan. Worldwide it has sold 1.1 million copies.

Final Fantasy IV was well received by critics. It was a nominee for Best RPG on the Nintendo DS in IGN's 2008 video game awards.

Writing for TechRadar, Christian de Looper and Emma Boyle called the remake one of the best Nintendo DS games they played. Dorkly's Tristan Cooper placed the game at #20 on a list of the best Nintendo DS games and said the remake made Final Fantasy IV feel even more epic. Lifewire's Alex Williams called the game one of the best role-playing games on the Nintendo DS and highlighted its complex, character-driven plot.

See also
 List of Square Enix video game franchises

Notes

References

External links
 Official website

Role-playing video games
Android (operating system) games
Final Fantasy IV
Final Fantasy video games
IOS games
Nintendo DS games
Video game remakes
Japanese role-playing video games
Windows games
Matrix Software games
2007 video games
Video games developed in Japan
Video games scored by Junya Nakano
Multiplayer and single-player video games

fr:Final Fantasy IV#Nintendo DS